Kingston Lisle is a village and civil parish in the Vale of White Horse, England, about  west of Wantage and  south-southeast of Faringdon. The 2011 Census recorded the parish population as 225. Kingston Lisle was part of Berkshire until the 1974 local government boundary changes transferred the Vale of White Horse to Oxfordshire.

Geography
The village is a spring line settlement at the foot of Blowing Stone Hill, which is part of the escarpment of the Berkshire Downs.

Archaeology
It is a prehistoric road that is now a long-distance footpath. Legend has it that King Alfred the Great blew through it to summon his troops for the Battle of Ashdown in 871.

Toponym
"Kingston" is a common English toponym. It means simply a tūn of the king. Tūn is Old English for a fence, and hence came to mean an enclosure, farm or manor. An entry for 1220 in the Book of Fees records it as Kingeston. The suggestion that it is derived from "King's Stone", referring to the Blowing Stone, is false etymology. The suffix "Lisle" was added in the 14th century, when it was the surname of the lord of the manor. 14th-century Charter Rolls record it as Kyngeston Lisle in 1322 and Kingston del Isle in 1336.

Parish church
The nave and chancel of the Church of England parish church of Saint John the Baptist was built in about 1200. The chancel windows are each 14th-century Decorated Gothic. Some 14th-century stained glass survives in a south window of the chancel. Around the east and north windows of the chancel are 14th-century murals of Saint Peter, Saint Paul, and the martyrdom of Saint John the Baptist. The church is a Grade II* listed building.  St John's parish is part of the Ridgeway Benefice, along with the parishes of Childrey, Letcombe Bassett, Letcombe Regis, Sparsholt and West Challow.

Economic and social history
The Domesday Book in 1086 records Kingston Lisle as having 31 households. Kingston Lisle Park is a 17th-century country house on the edge of the village. It was enlarged early the 18th and 19th centuries and is a Grade II* listed building. Between 1805 and 1807 the section of the Wilts & Berks Canal between Longcot and Challow was completed. Traffic on the canal had virtually ceased by 1901 and the route was formally abandoned in 1914. The Wilts & Berks Canal Trust is currently restoring the canal. The Great Western Main Line through the Vale of White Horse was opened in 1840.

Amenities
The village has one pub, the Blowing Stone Inn.

In literature
The village features in Thomas Hughes' novel Tom Brown's School Days.

Gallery

References

Bibliography

External links

Kingston Lisle

Civil parishes in Oxfordshire
Vale of White Horse
Villages in Oxfordshire